Suzdal is a town that serves as the administrative center of Suzdalsky District in Vladimir Oblast, Russia, which is located on the Kamenka River,  north of the city of Vladimir. Vladimir is the administrative center of the surrounding oblast. As of the 2021 Census, its population was 9,286.

Suzdal is one of the oldest Russian towns. In the 12th century, it became the capital of the principality, while Moscow was merely one of its subordinate settlements. Currently, Suzdal is the smallest of the Russian Golden Ring towns, but it has more than 40 historically important monuments and 200 architectural sites. Several of these sites are listed as UNESCO World Heritage Sites.

History

The town's history dates back probably to 999 or 1024, and in 1125 Yury Dolgoruky made Suzdal the capital of the Rostov-Suzdal principality. Suzdal began to function as a capital at the time when Moscow was still a cluster of cowsheds. In 1157, Andrei Bogolyubsky moved the capital from Suzdal to Vladimir, from which time the principality was known as Vladimir-Suzdal. Set in a fertile wheat-growing area, Suzdal remained a trade centre even after Mongol-led invasions. Eventually, it united with Nizhny Novgorod until both were annexed by Moscow in 1392.

After a decline in political importance, the town rose in prominence as a religious center with incredible development projects funded by Vasily III and Ivan the Terrible in the 16th century. In the late 17th and 18th centuries, wealthy merchants paid for 30 charming churches, which still adorn the town. Thus, Suzdal reached a remarkable ratio of churches to citizens: at one point, 40 churches per 400 families.

In 1864, local merchants failed to coerce the government into building the Trans-Siberian Railway through their town. As a result, Suzdal was bypassed not only by trains, but by the 20th century altogether. Furthermore, in 1967 Suzdal earned a federally protected status, which officially limited the development in the area. That is why the place remains largely the same as ages ago—its cute wooden cottages mingling with golden cupolas that reflect in the river Kamenka, which meanders sleepily through gentle hills and flower-filled meadows.

In 1943, high ranking Nazi officers captured at the Battle of Stalingrad were imprisoned within the monastery.

Today, the town operates as an important tourist center, featuring many fine examples of old Russian architecture—most of them churches and monasteries. Although having just under ten thousand residents, Suzdal still retains a rural look with streams and meadows everywhere and chicken and livestock a common sight on the streets, some of which remain unpaved. This juxtaposition of stunning medieval architecture with its pastoral setting lends Suzdal a picturesque charm, and in the summer, artists and easels are a common sight.

Administrative and municipal status
Within the framework of administrative divisions, Suzdal serves as the administrative center of Suzdalsky District, to which it is directly subordinated. As a municipal division, the town of Suzdal is incorporated within Suzdalsky Municipal District as Suzdal Urban Settlement.

Tourism
The only industry in the town is tourism. Suzdal avoided the industrialisation of the Soviet times and was able to preserve a great number of stunning examples of the Russian architecture of the 13th-19th century. There are 305 monuments and listed buildings in Suzdal, including 30 churches, 14 bell towers and 5 monasteries and convents. 79 of them are federally protected buildings and 167 are regionally protected.

In 1992 two of the monuments (Saviour Monastery of St Euthymius and Kremlin with Nativity of the Virgin Cathedral) were included in the UNESCO World Heritage List, together with six other White Monuments in this region.

Main sights
The Kremlin is the oldest part of Suzdal, dating from the 10th century. It is a predecessor of the Moscow Kremlin. In the 12th century it was the base of prince Yury Dolgoruky, who ruled the vast northeastern part of Kievan Rus' and, among many other things, founded an outpost, which is now Moscow. A posad (settlement) to the east became home to the secular population - shopkeepers and craftsmen, while the Kremlin (fortress) proper was the home of the prince, the archbishop, and the high clergy. Within the Kremlin, the Archbishop’s Chambers houses the Suzdal History Exhibition, which includes a visit to the 18th-century Cross Hall, which was used for receptions. More exhibits are provided in the 1635 kremlin bell tower (Звонница) in the yard.
The  earth rampart of Kremlin encloses a number of houses and churches, including the Nativity of the Virgin Cathedral. This cathedral, with its blue domes spangled with gold, was constructed in 1222-1225 by Yury II on the site of an earlier church built around 1102 by Vladimir Monomakh. It was built of light tufa with limestones for details. In 1445 the cathedral collapsed and was rebuilt in 1528-1530 with the upper structure and drums being constructed of new brick. The original 13th-century door from the cathedral is now on exhibition in the Archbishop’s Chambers.
Saviour Monastery of St Euthymius was founded in 1352 to the north of the town centre on the high bank of the Kamenka river. It was built under the order of the Suzdal-Nizhniy Novgorod prince Konstantin. The monastery was planned as a fortress and was originally enclosed by a wooden wall, later destroyed by the Poles. Today's reddish brick walls of the Suzdal monastery were erected over four years, from 1640 to 1644. The solid fortifications have 12 towers constructed according to the artillery power which appeared at that time. When the value of the monastery as a fortress was lost, a new application was found - it became a prison. Prisoners were most brutally punished there, and the place fell into disrepute. In 1905 the prison was abolished.
Wooden Church of St. Nicholas. This church was built in Glotovo in 1766 and was moved to Suzdal in 1960 to be part of a Museum of Wooden Architecture & Peasant Life. The church is elevated off the ground about a story high from when it was moved across the country. This church is made out of all wood and represents the close relationship between wood and stone architecture and how precise the Russians were while building this back in 1766.
St John the Baptist Church. This church was built in 1720, at the same time that the St. Nicholas church was built, although the difference between the types of architecture of the two churches is quite remarkable. Whereas the St. Nicholas Church is all wooden, the St. John Church is made out of white plastered walls with wooden supports.
The St Alexander Convent. This church was built in 1240 by an unknown architect. It is said that the princesses of Suzdal, Mariya and Agrippina, were buried here in the 14th century.
Intercession Convent. The convent was founded in 1364. In its center stands the cathedral of the Intercession; it was an add-on built in 1518 financed by Moscow knaz (king) Basil The Third. The interior of the cathedral has no paintings or stained glass, it is simply plain white stone walls all around. The church was and still is one of the richest convents in Russia. The convent is the home of many nuns and is also the burial vault for twenty nuns of noble birth. Connected to the white stoned wall cathedral is an art museum which can be toured. There are many paintings but none in the cathedral itself. This building is filled with arches and art created in the 16th and 17th century.

Festivals
Open Russian Festival of Animated Film is held in Suzdal in March annually since 2002, with the support of the Russian Ministry of Culture.
Cucumber Day Festival with folk music performances is celebrated by locals on the second Saturday of July, every year since 2001.

Infrastructure
There are four major hotels in Suzdal:
Nikolaevsky Posad (180 rooms)
Pushkarskaya Sloboda (291 rooms)
Heliopark (185 rooms)
GTK Suzdal (705 rooms)
There are also 50 guest-houses with a total number of 700 more rooms. Thus Suzdal has developed an outstanding ratio of about 20 hotel rooms per 100 population (comparing to 0.2 rooms for Russia in general, or 1.6 rooms for USA).

Suzdal has 13 restaurants (with 1429 seats), 10 cafes (305 seats), 11 bars and 73 souvenir shops.

In 1982 Suzdal became the first Russian town to receive "La Pomme d'Or" ("The Golden Apple") -  a prize for excellence in the tourism industry, awarded annually by the World Federation of Travel Journalists and Writers (FIJET).

Film
More than 60 movies were filmed in Suzdal and the vicinity. Among them:

Andrei Rublev (USSR, 1966)
Bratya Karamazovy (USSR, 1969)
Finist, the brave Falcon (USSR, 1976)
The Shooting Party (USSR, 1978)
Tema (USSR, 1979)
Yunost Petra (USSR, 1980)
Charodei (USSR, 1982)
Dead Souls (USSR, 1984)
Peter the Great (USA, 1986)
Tsar (Russia, 2009)

According to local historian Yury Belov, in the summer of 1964 three different feature films (Metel, Zhenitba Balzaminova and Tsarskaya nevesta) were filmed in Suzdal at the same time.

Twin towns
Suzdal is twinned with:
 Rothenburg ob der Tauber, Germany, since 1988
 Cles, Italy, since 1991
 Oberlin, United States, since 1991
 Windham, United States, since 1992
 Évora, Portugal, since 2006
 Loches, France, since 2011
 Shangrao, China, since 2012

People

Solomonia Saburova (1490–1542), the first wife of Grand prince Vasili III of Muscovy, canonized by the Russian Orthodox Church as St Sofia of Suzdal
Dmitry Pozharsky (1577–1642), national hero, granted the unprecedented title Saviour of the Motherland for routing the Polish invasion
Eudoxia Lopukhina (1669–1698), Tsarina, the first wife of Peter the Great, banished to the Intercession Convent of Suzdal
Dmitry Vinogradov (1720–1758), chemist, the founder of the Imperial Porcelain Factory, Saint Petersburg
Aleksei Gastev (1882–1939), revolutionary, trade-union activist and a pioneer of scientific management in Russia
Sergei Shirokogorov (1887–1939), founder of Russian anthropology
Vasily Blokhin (1895–1955), chief executioner of the NKVD during the Great Purge and World War II

See also

References

Sources 
 Brumfield, William (2009). Suzdal: Architectural Heritage in Photographs. Moscow: Tri Kvadrata. .

External links

 Official website of Suzdal 
 Aerial panoramas of Suzdal
 Suzdal photos

 
Suzdalsky Uyezd
Golden Ring of Russia